Mallota is a village in the municipality of Megalopoli, Arcadia, Greece. It is situated on a hillside, 1 km northeast of Rapsommati, 2 km west of Palaiochouni and 5 km east of Megalopoli.  Mallota had a population of 46 in 2011. The Motorway A7 (Corinth - Tripoli - Kalamata) passes south of the village.

Population

See also
List of settlements in Arcadia

References

External links
 Mallota GTP Travel Pages

Megalopolis, Greece
Populated places in Arcadia, Peloponnese